W237BZ, known on-air as 95.3 The Beat, is a radio station licensed to Clayton, North Carolina. The station airs a Classic hip hop radio format. The station is operated by iHeartMedia (formerly Clear Channel Communications). The translator simulcasts the programming of WDCG-HD2, along with a second translator, W236CA in Durham, which began simulcasting on 95.1 FM in late 2015.

History

W237BZ began broadcasting in November 2012 as a translator for WDCG-HD2, which signed on with an Alternative Rock format as "95X".

On January 9, 2018, the station rebranded as "Alt 95.3".

On November 11, 2021, at 10 a.m., WDCG-HD2/W236CA/W237BZ dumped the alternative format after 9 years and began stunting with Christmas music as "Christmas 95.3".

On December 20, 2021, 95.3 started airing sweepers for its future format, Classic Hip Hop as "95.3 The Beat", which would debut on December 26. At midnight on that date, after playing "Little Drummer Boy" by Bob Seger, W237BZ, W236CA, and WDCG-HD2 officially flipped to Classic Hip Hop as "95.3 The Beat". The first song on "The Beat" was "Party Up (Up in Here)" by DMX. The station is running 5,000 commercial-free songs in a row to launch its new format.

Translators

References

External links 
Official website
Listen Live

W237BZ on Radio-Locator

W236CA on Radio-Locator

237BZ
Radio stations established in 2012
IHeartMedia radio stations